Plasmodium billbrayi is a parasite of the genus Plasmodium subgenus Laverania.  

P. billbrayi is phylogenetically very close to Plasmodium gaboni, with both sharing a recent common ancestor. The parasite is named in honour of the distinguished malariologist “Bill” Robert Stow Bray (1923–2008).

Taxonomy 
Plasmodium billbrayi was first described along with Plasmodium billcollinsi by Krief et al. in February 2010, by sequencing the whole Plasmodium mitochondrial genome in chimpanzees.

Distribution 
This species is found in East Africa.

Hosts 
Plasmodium billbrayi infects common chimpanzees (Pan troglodytes) and Eastern chimpanzees (Pan troglodytes schweinfurthii).

See also 
List of Plasmodium species infecting primates

References 

billbrayi